The Ericson 23-2 is an American trailerable sailboat that was designed by Bruce King as a cruiser and first built in 1975.

The design was originally marketed by the manufacturer as the Ericson 23, but is now usually referred to as the Ericson 23-2 to differentiate it from the earlier 1969 Ericson 23-1 design.

Production
The design was built by Ericson Yachts in the United States from 1975 until 1979, with 270 boats completed, but it is now out of production.

Design
The Ericson 23-2 is a recreational keelboat, built predominantly of fiberglass, with wood trim. It has a masthead sloop rig, a raked stem, an angled transom, a transom-hung rudder controlled by a tiller and a fixed fin keel or keel and centerboard. The centerboard model was by far more popular.

The boat is normally fitted with a small  outboard motor for docking and maneuvering.

The design has sleeping accommodation for four people, with a double "V"-berth in the bow cabin and two straight settee quarter berths in the main cabin. The galley is located on the starboard side just forward of the companionway ladder. The galley is equipped with a two-burner stove and a sink. The head is located just aft of the bow cabin on the port side.

Variants
Ericson 23-2 fin keel
This model displaces  and carries  of lead ballast. The boat has a PHRF racing average handicap of 216 to 234, with an average of 225.
Ericson 23-2 keel and centerboard
This model displaces  and carries  of ballast. The boat has a PHRF racing average handicap of 222 to 243, with an average of 234.

Operational history
In a 2007 review in Sailing Magazine, John Kretschmer wrote, "both versions of the Ericson 23 are good-looking boats. Each has a sweet, subtle sheerline, moderate freeboard and a sexy, sloping cabintrunk with two small portlights. The most obvious difference between models, aside from the centerboard, is the rudder. MK IIs have a transom-hung rudder while the MK I has the more common rudderpost mounted through the cockpit sole. The MK II deck is also a bit more flush, and the cockpit coaming boards of the MK I were exchanged for molded coamings. Although the MK II has a higher aspect sailplan, the mast on both boats is a beefy aluminum section, especially for a small boat, and is a bit of a load to hoist from the trailer, at least until you get the hang of it. Ericson used the same mast section on its 23, 25 and 27 models. The rig on the MK II translates into around 240 square feet of working sail area and that provides plenty of horsepower for the 3,200-pound Ericson 23. The MK II also came with a fixed keel however, as noted earlier, most were centerboard models. Naturally these latter models were easier for launching from a trailer and the less than 2-foot board-up draft makes the shallowest channels navigable. An optional hoist allows easy adjustment of the rudder, reducing drag downwind and depth for thin water sailing."

See also
List of sailing boat types

References

Keelboats
1970s sailboat type designs
Sailing yachts
Trailer sailers
Sailboat type designs by Bruce King
Sailboat types built by Ericson Yachts